Some variants of feminism are considered more conservative than others. Historically feminist scholars tend to not have much interest in conservative women but in recent years there have been efforts at greater scholarly analysis of these women and their views.

Because almost any variant of feminism can have a conservative element, this list does not attempt to list variants of feminism simply with conservative elements. Instead, this list is of feminism variants that are primarily conservative.

List 
This list may include organizations or individuals where a conservative feminism is more readily identified that way, but is primarily a list of feminisms per se. Generally, organizations and people related to a feminism should not be in this list but should be found by following links to articles about various feminisms with which such organizations and people are associated.
 Backlash feminism: see new conservative feminism in this list
 Balanced feminism: see right-wing feminism in this list
 Conservative feminism (in addition to various feminisms in this list and that are conservative):
 Katherine Kersten objects "that in many of their endeavors women continue to face greater obstacles to their success than men do", thus acknowledging that sexism exists, and does not reject feminism entirely but draws on a classical feminist tradition, for example Margaret Fuller. Kersten advocates for conservative feminism based on equality and justice defined alike for women and men and acknowledgment of historical and present injustice suffered by women. She also advocates building on Western ideals and institutions, with reform pursued slowly and cautiously and accepting that human failings mean that perfection is unattainable. Her concerns include crime and violence against women, cultural popular media's degradation of women, noncommittal sex, and poverty's feminization, but opposing affirmative action and class action litigation.
 Sarah Palin "made her case for conservative feminism" in 2010, at a meeting of the Susan B. Anthony List.
 Richard A. Posner "suggest[s]" "'conservative feminism' .... is ... the idea that women are entitled to political, legal, social, and economic equality to men, in the framework of a lightly regulated market economy." Posner tentatively argues for taxing housewives' at-home unpaid work to reduce a barrier to paid outside work (argued by D. Kelly Weisberg to be rooted in a Marxist feminist argument for waged housework) and argues for sex being a factor in setting wages and benefits in accordance with productivity, health costs with pregnancy, on-the-job safety, and longevity for pensions. Posner is against comparable worth among private employers, against no-fault divorce, in favour of surrogate motherhood by binding contract, against rape even in the form of nonviolent sex, and for a possibility that pornography may either incite rape or substitute for it. Posner does not argue for or against an abortion right, arguing instead for a possibility but not a certainty that the fetus is "a member of society" because libertarianism and economics do not say one way or the other. Posner argues that the differences between the genders on average include women's lesser aggressiveness and greater child-centeredness and has "no quarrel" with law being empathetic to "all marginal groups".
 Domestic feminism: see old conservative feminism in this list
Maternal feminism
 Equity feminism
 Individualist feminism was cast to appeal to "younger women ... of a more conservative generation" and includes concepts from Rene Denfeld and Naomi Wolf, essentially that "feminism should no longer be about communal solutions to communal problems but individual solutions to individual problems", and concepts from Wendy McElroy
 Evangelical Protestant Christian Profeminism ("Karen .... articulates the Evangelical [Protestant] profeminist position particularly well. Like profeminist Catholics and Jews, she feels that the women's liberation movement was a necessary response to the oppression of women. She praises the achievements of feminism in society as well as in Evangelical communities and insists that sexism persists and that further changes are necessary. Yet Karen, too, criticizes the movement for seeking to eliminate gender differences, devaluing motherhood and homemaking, and being led by extremists who do not represent ordinary American women, particularly with respect to the issues of homosexuality and abortion. Her comments on the latter two issues ... resemble ... closely the statements made by antifeminist Evangelicals.")
 National Woman's Party, in the U.S., was led by Alice Paul, described as "[articulating a] narrow and conservative version of feminism".
New Catholic feminism, embraced by conservative Catholic women as a form of reconciling their struggle for equality with the Church's official teachings on women. Influenced by Personalism and Phenomenology, as well as Pope John Paul II's Mulieris dignitatem, this school is represented by historian Elizabeth Fox-Genovese, theologians Alice Von Hildebrand, Prudence Allen and Robert Stackpole, journalist Colleen Carroll Campbell, among others.
 new conservative feminism, or backlash feminism, is arguably antifeminist and is represented by Betty Friedan in The Second Stage and Jean Bethke Elshtain in Public Man, Private Woman and anticipated by Alice Rossi, A Biosocial Perspective on Parenting. These authors do not necessarily agree with each other on all major points. According to Judith Stacey, new conservative feminism rejects the politicization of sexuality, supports families, gender differentiation, femininity, and mothering, and deprioritizes opposition to male domination.
 Old Conservative Feminism or Domestic Feminism, from the 19th century
 Postfeminism
 Right-wing Feminism, or balanced feminism, includes the work of Independent Women's Forum, Feminists for Life of America, and ifeminists.net headed by Wendy McElroy. It generally draws on principles of first-wave feminism and against both postfeminism and academic or radical feminism, the latter being defined to include left and progressive politics, not only feminism based on gender oppression. Right-wing feminism supports both motherhood and women having careers and both individuality and biological determinism; it accepts gender equality in careers while believing that numerical equality will naturally not occur in all occupations.
 State feminism
 Imperial feminism
 Womansurge: see Women's Equity Action League in this list
 Women's Equity Action League (WEAL) was formed originally by some of the more conservative members of the National Organization for Women (NOW), when NOW was viewed as radical. The members who founded WEAL focused on employment and education, and shunned issues of contraception and abortion. Its founders called it a "'conservative NOW'". Its methods were "conventional", especially lobbying and lawsuits. The departures from NOW left NOW freer to pursue reproductive freedom and the Equal Rights Amendment. "[T]he fragmentation process, as organizations broke up and reformed, .... retained women within the movement who might otherwise have left it. This is what happened in the case of NOW, when it split up over internal divisions, and new feminism was nevertheless able to retain the most conservative elements through the formation of WEAL. At first, in fact, WEAL called itself the 'right wing of the women's movement.' Another NOW spinoff, Womansurge, tended to attract older women, who felt more comfortable in it than in NOW, which was becoming more politically radical under the influence of a new younger generation of militants."
 In the United Kingdom, it is now common for prominent women in the Conservative Party to declare that they are feminists; this trend began with Theresa May wearing a t-shirt by the Fawcett Society emblazoned with the words 'This is What a Feminist Looks Like'. Today, British female Conservative Parliamentarians claim that they are feminists, and claim feminist justification, while advocating a range of policies, from equal career opportunities for women to, in the case of Anna Soubry and others, opposing pornography. The Conservative MP Nadine Dorries has even put forward a feminist argument for restricting abortion.

See also 
 
 
 List of feminists

Notes

References

Bibliography 

  Table of contents.

Further reading

Books 
 Dworkin, Andrea, Right-Wing Women: The Politics of Domesticated Females (N.Y.: Coward-McCann (also Wideview/Perigee Book), 1983)
 Young, Cathy, Ceasefire!: Why Women and Men Must Join Forces to Achieve True Equality (N.Y.: Free Press, 1999); she argues for a "philosophy" (id., p. 10 (Introduction: The Gender Wars)) and "do[es]n't know if this philosophy should be called feminism or something else" (id., p. 11 (Introduction))

Articles 
 Grant, Jane, Confession of a Feminist, in The American Mercury, vol. LVII, no. 240, Dec., 1943, pp. 684–691.
 Kersten, Katherine, What Do Women Want?, in Policy Review, issue 56, Spring, 1991
 Klatch, Rebecca, Women of the New Right
 Lee, Martha F., Nesta Webster: The Voice of Conspiracy, in Journal of Women's History, vol. 17, no. 3 (Fall, 2005), p. 81 ff. (biography including on feminism)
 Burfitt-Dons, Louise, The successes and failures of feminism, on Conservative Home Jan 4, 2014
 Swift, David, From "I'm not a feminist but..." to "Call me an old-fashioned feminist...", in Women's History Review, (Summer, 2018).

Blogs 
 Louise Burfitt-Dons, The Common Sense Feminist

Conservatism-related lists
Feminism-related lists
Feminist movements and ideologies
Anti-pornography feminism